Băltăreți may refer to several villages in Romania:

 Băltăreți, a village in Ulmeni, Buzău
 Băltăreți, a village in Cosmești, Galați